Charles Samuel Perry (April 6, 1921 – July 21, 2001) was an American professional basketball player. He played in the National Basketball League for the Detroit Gems. In five games he averaged 3.0 points per contest.

Perry was also an All-American receiver at left end for the Tuskegee Golden Tigers football team in 1942.

References 

1921 births
2001 deaths
American men's basketball players
Basketball players from Savannah, Georgia
Detroit Gems players
Guards (basketball)
Tuskegee Golden Tigers baseball players
Tuskegee Golden Tigers football players
Tuskegee Golden Tigers men's basketball players